The  is a  (legal commentary) on the Yajnavalkya Smriti best known for its theory of "inheritance by birth." It was written by Vijñāneśvara, a scholar in the Western Chalukya court in the late eleventh and early twelfth century.. Along with the Dāyabhāga, it was considered one of the main authorities on Hindu Law from the time the British began administering laws in India.

Author
Vijñāneśvara lived at Marthur near kalaburagi (Karnataka), near the end of the eleventh century during the reign of Vikramaditya VI of the Cālukya dynasty of Kalyāni, one of the great rulers of the Deccan.  He was a "profound student of the Purva-Mimamsa system," a system of exegetical thought focused on the interpretation of the Vedas.  Contrary to Derrett's opinion based on Yajnavalkya 2.4 and 2.305 that Vijñāneśvara was a judge, Kane holds that these passages about characteristics of judges do not reflect a social or historical reality, but rather an interpretation based upon Mimamsa.

Date and historical context
He places it after 1050 CE because it names Viśvarūpa, Medhātithi, and Dhāreśvara, other commentators, as authoritative sources. Derrett places the text between 1121 CE and 1125 CE, a much shorter time frame than Kane, but Kane claims that this time frame is purely arbitrary, and Derrett does not provide the evidence to support his claim. Lingat, however, is content to place the  simply at the end of the eleventh century.

Sources and topics
Vijñāneśvara's commentary "brings together numerous  passages, explains away contradictions among them by following the rules of interpretation laid down in the Purva Mimamsa system, brings about order by assigning to various dicta their proper scope and province...and effects a synthesis of apparently unconnected  injunctions." In this sense, the commentary is similar to a digest (nibandha) in that it attempts to draw into the commentary outside opinions about the same passages of the text which he is commenting on. The 's most important topics include property rights, property distribution, and inheritance. This text has become the authority, especially on inheritance, throughout most of India after the British began to move in.

Effect on British India
The , along with the Dāyabhāga, became an influential source for British Courts in India. The  was influential throughout the majority of India, except in Bengal, Assam and some of the parts in Odisha and Bihar, where the Dāyabhāga prevailed as an authority for law. The British were interested in administering law in India, but they wanted to administer the law that already existed to the people. Thus, they searched for a text that could be used to help solve disputes among the people of India in manners which were already customary in the sub continent. These disputes often involved property rights or inheritance issues. At that point, the  held the status of a legislative text because it was used as a direct resource regarding inheritance in the courts of law in most of India.

Translations
W. Macnaghten did the second translation, dealing with procedure, in 1829.

Sub-commentaries

The 13th-century Telugu language text Vijnaneshvaramu is based on Mitākṣarā.

Notes

References
 Suryanath U. Kamat, A Concise history of Karnataka from pre-historic times to the present, Jupiter books, MCC, Bangalore, 2001 (Reprinted 2002) OCLC: 7796041 
 K.A. Nilakanta Sastri, History of South India, From Prehistoric times to fall of Vijayanagar, 1955, OUP, New Delhi (Reprinted 2002), 
 Charles Li, "Lakṣmīdevī’s 'intellectual petticoats' and the flamewar they inspired." Texts Surrounding Texts: Satellite Stanzas, Prefaces and Colophons in South-Indian Manuscripts. 11 June 2021.

External links
The Importance of Mitakshara in the 21st century by Justice Markandey Katju

Hindu law
Ancient Indian law